Pyotr Vladimirovich Tochilin (born June 15, 1974 in Chişinău, Moldavian Soviet Socialist Republic) is a Russian film director and screenwriter. He has won several film awards.

Biography
Tochilin was born on June 15, 1974 in Moldavian Soviet Socialist Republic.

In 1996 he graduated from "Moscow State University of Culture and Arts" degree in "Directing film and TV".

In 2006, he directed the film Khottabych. From 2008 to 2009, he worked on the show Univer.

Filmography
 Upotrebit' do: (1999)
 Khottabych (2006)
 Univer (TV series, 2008)
 Rokery (2009)
 Geroi prodazh (2011)
 Dublyor (2013)
 Obratnaya storona Luny (2015)

External links
Official website
Pyotr Tochilin Facebook

  Энциклопедия отечественного кино 
  СТВ

1974 births
Russian film directors
Russian screenwriters
Male screenwriters
Russian male writers
Soviet film directors
Living people